Blepharocerus is a genus of snout moths. It was described by Charles Émile Blanchard in 1852, and is known from Trinidad.

Species
 Blepharocerus chilensis Zeller, 1874
 Blepharocerus ignitalis Hampson, 1906
 Blepharocerus rosellus Blanchard, 1852
 Blepharocerus rubescens (Kaye, 1925)

References

Chrysauginae
Pyralidae genera